Gomitogo is a village and seat of the commune of Pondori in the Cercle of Djenné in the Mopti Region of southern-central Mali.

References

Populated places in Mopti Region